This is a list of years in Switzerland. See also the timeline of Swiss history.  For only articles about years in Switzerland that have been written, see :Category:Years in Switzerland.

Twenty-first century

Twentieth century

Nineteenth century

See also 
 Timeline of Swiss history
 List of years by country

 
Switzerland history-related lists
Switzerland